London County may refer to:

Greater London, England, a present-day county
City of London, England, a city-county, and enclave of Greater London
County of London, England, a former county
London County Council
London County Cricket Club, a short-lived English cricket club

See also
London (disambiguation)